Neolana is a genus of South Pacific sheetweb spiders first described by Raymond Robert Forster & C. L. Wilton in 1973.  it contains only three species, all found in New Zealand.

References

Araneomorphae genera
Spiders of New Zealand
Stiphidiidae
Taxa named by Raymond Robert Forster